"Taking a Walk" is a song by American rapper Trippie Redd, released as the third single from his debut studio album Life's a Trip on August 6, 2018. Produced by co-songwriters Scott Storch and Avedon, it is Redd's second highest-charting song to date.

Background 
Trippie Redd first teased the song in December 2017, but the snippet was removed and re-uploaded in early March 2018. On April 4, 2018, he posted a second snippet on his Instagram story, which showed him in a studio with rapper Nebu Kiniza. Although this raised speculation of a guest appearance in the song, the collaboration did not happen.

The song was released on August 6, 2018. That same day, Redd also revealed the tracklist for his album Life's A Trip, which was released four days later.

Charts

Certifications

References 

2018 singles
2018 songs
Trippie Redd songs
Songs written by Trippie Redd
Songs written by Scott Storch
Song recordings produced by Scott Storch